is a Japanese gymnast. Kuwahara was part of the Japanese team that won the silver medal in the team event at the 2006 Asian Games.

References

External links
 

1981 births
Living people
Japanese male artistic gymnasts
Medalists at the World Artistic Gymnastics Championships
Place of birth missing (living people)
Asian Games medalists in gymnastics
Gymnasts at the 2006 Asian Games
Gymnasts at the 2010 Asian Games
Asian Games silver medalists for Japan
Asian Games bronze medalists for Japan
Medalists at the 2006 Asian Games
Medalists at the 2010 Asian Games
20th-century Japanese people
21st-century Japanese people